The United Right (ZP) is a conservative political alliance in Poland. It came to power following the 2015 parliamentary election.

Initially founded as a parliamentary group between the Poland Together and United Poland parties, its composition has changed several times since its inception and is now dominated by the ruling political party of Poland, the Law and Justice. As of May 2021, besides the Law and Justice and United Poland, the coalition is also composed of The Republicans, Piast Faction alongside external support from Kukiz'15.

History

Creation
The alliance was formed in 2014. The alliance initially was in the form of a parliamentary club in the Sejm called Just Poland (alternatively translated as Fair Poland) formed by politicians of Poland Together and United Poland. They then agreed to co-operate with the Law and Justice party (the Piast Faction were already incorporated with them) and joined Law and Justice's parliamentary club and electoral lists that same year, in time for the 2014 local elections and the 2015 parliamentary elections.

Ascent to power
The alliance has been in power since the 2015 elections. It has been opposed by the Civic Coalition, led by Civic Platform, since 2018.

Throughout the parliamentary term the coalition expanded its absolute majority by crossers of the floor from Polish People's Party, Civic Platform, Modern and Kukiz'15. A major factor was when in 2017, Poland Together merged with individual centre-right orientated defectors from The Republican Association, Civic Platform, Liberty, Law and Justice, Christian National Union, Polish People's Party and Kukiz'15 to form the Agreement Party centred around the leadership of Jarosław Gowin. In 2018, Free and Solidarity, a splinter group of Kukiz'15, joined the coalition. Its candidate for the 2018 Warsaw election was Patryk Jaki.

Internal disputes
In 2019 parliamentary election the alliance gained more votes, but due to appearance of the Confederation and The Left in Sejm and cooperation between the Civic Coalition, The Left, and the Polish Coalition in the Senate, it failed to gain more seats in Sejm and even lost their majority in the Senate.

In 2020 and 2021, the alliance has been affected by actions of rebellious MPs. It by itself was caused by results of 2019 parliamentary elections, when Law and Justice was reduced to 199 MPs and United Poland and Agreement increased their tallies to 18 MPs each. This led to notion that is enough for just some MPs in one of constituent parties (and not a whole party) to rebel and bring down the government. This has happened on several occasions, although never managing to dissolved the alliance itself.

The first such instances were during the preparations to 2020 presidential election. The Agreement Party did not support the Law and Justice proposal on postal voting in these elections.

A second crucial instance was when near-total abortion ban was drafted, which originally was brought by United Poland, but the Law and Justice and the Agreement party were initially sceptical about the notion. The third major rift was during the proposed changes to animal rights' which proposed no animal breeding for fur production and energy policies which proposed speeding up the reduction of coal production and the sudden suspension of Ostrołęka power plant construction. The Law and Justice had proposed the opposite policies in their election manifestos, but due to pressure from leader of the party, Jarosław Kaczyński, and the European Commission, the policies were changed.

Major reshuffling and loss of absolute majority in Sejm
On 20 June 2021, the reactivation of the congress of the Republicans took place. Karol Rabenda announced that some Agreement members will join the Republican association and restructure it into a party, and that the newly formed party will subsequently join the governing coalition as a full member. In response, the Law and Justice chairman Jarosław Kaczyński made a speech praising the new reformed party.

After Jarosław Gowin's scepticism with the "Polish Deal" proposal (an economic recovery plan for countering the COVID-19 recession in Poland) and media law changes that would have affected a TVN24, Gowin was publicly removed from his position as deputy prime minister, resulting in realignment of the composition of the coalition. As result, Adam Bielan's "Agreement rebels" new party joined the coalition as replacements. The remaining Kukiz '15 MP's led by Paweł Kukiz have declared their support for the coalition by signing an agreement without formally joining.

After this, coalition lost its absolute majority in Sejm, which it enjoyed since 2015 parliamentary election.

On 3 September 2021, five more former Agreement MPs decided to continue their support of Law and Justice government after the remainder of the party went into opposition, creating Renew PR political party under the leadership of Marcin Ociepa. The other four MPs were Andrzej Gut-Mostowy, Wojciech Murdzek, Grzegorz Piechowiak and Anna Dąbrowska-Banaszek.

Further internal disputes
In April 2022 it was noted that SP, most notably its leader Zbigniew Ziobro, and PiS were in a major dispute regarding the dissolution of the Supreme Court Disciplinary Chamber and repealing the law concerning the matter, a focal point of an ongoing constitutional crisis.

The proposal was made by the president Andrzej Duda, noting a complete u-turn on the subject.

The escalation of the dispute was further noted by accusatory statements between Ziobro and Ryszard Terlecki, leading the former to call the situation a "real pâté" (Polish idiom equivalent of a sticky wicket).

It was noted that the latest political disagreement could lead to early elections and a definitive end to the coalition.

Attempts at expansion
On 22 June 2022, Andrzej Sośnierz was thrown out of the Agreement Party after his parliamentary group "Polish Affairs" signed an agreement with Law and Justice. Sośnierz, along with the leader of the group Agnieszka Ścigaj (who was appointed Minister without portfolio) confirmed their participation in the coalition as independent MPs, with Paweł Szramka leaving the group.

Ideology and factions 
Law and Justice is a right-wing coalition, and is divided into many internal factions, but they can be grouped into three main blocks. The United Right coalition has been described as solidarist, and fiscally statist. It previously used to include a paternalistic conservative faction.

Order of the Centre Agreement is unofficial name of the most influential, although not the most numerous fraction of PiS. Its leader is Jarosław Kaczyński, main members are Joachim Brudziński, Adam Lipiński and Mariusz Błaszczak. It is  economically left-wing.
Second of PiS' groups is radical, religious and hard eurosceptic right-wing faction focused around Antoni Macierewicz, Beata Szydło and United Poland party of Zbigniew Ziobro. The faction stays in opposition to Mateusz Morawiecki, opts for radical reforms and is supported by Jacek Kurski and Tadeusz Rydzyk.

Composition

Current

External support

Former

Electoral performance

Sejm

Presidential

See also 
 Fidesz-KDNP

Notes

References 

Political party alliances in Poland
Euroscepticism in Poland
Conservatism in Poland
Far-right political parties in Poland
Right-wing parties in Europe